The Vancouver version of the NWA British Empire Heavyweight Championship was defended as the top singles title in Vancouver-based Big Time Wrestling and its successor, NWA All Star Wrestling, from 1959 until sometime after the last champion, Gene Kiniski, won the title in 1963

Title history

See also
List of National Wrestling Alliance championships

References

External links
NWA British Empire Heavyweight title history (Vancouver)

National Wrestling Alliance championships
Heavyweight wrestling championships
National professional wrestling championships
Professional wrestling in British Columbia